Barbara Freire-Marreco (1879–1967) was an English anthropologist and folklorist. She was a member of the first class of anthropology students to graduate from Oxford in 1908.

Biography 
She was born to a family of St Mawes in Cornwall, originally from Portugal, and spent her childhood in Horsell, Surrey. Barbara married Robert Aitken during World War I, meeting while they were employed at the War Trade Intelligence Department.  They eventually moved to the county of Hampshire.

Her works were inspired by the lectures of John Linton Myres and Henry Balfour, after which she began a Classical education and achieved distinction in the field of anthropology. She remained a student of Balfour, and her education spanned a fellowship at Oxford and as a student of Professor Hobhouse at the London School of Economics. Her papers were published in Man and read before the British Association. She took a position at the Pitt Rivers Museum to study for her diploma and remained associated with this institution when this was completed; a collection of her specimens held at the museum.  She became a fellow of the Royal Anthropological Institute in 1907. From 1909 to 1913 she held a research fellowship at Somerville College, Oxford where she researched 'the nature of authority of chiefs and kings in uncivilized society'. Her membership in the Folklore Society from 1926 was preceded by articles in its journal, for which she continued to contribute 'Scraps of English folklore', correspondence, and a 1959 study of "processes of localization and relocalization" of folklore.

The results of her fieldwork on the Pueblo peoples, collected in 1910 and 1913, was published by the authors of the Smithsonian's Ethnobotany of the Tewa Indians.

References

 A Life Well Led: The Biography of Barbara Freire-Marreco Aitken, British Anthropologist (2008) by Mary Ellen Blair

External links

1879 births
1967 deaths
First women admitted to degrees at Oxford
English anthropologists
British women anthropologists
English folklorists
Women folklorists
Fellows of Somerville College, Oxford